This is a list of Buddhist temples, monasteries, stupas, and pagodas in Mongolia for which there are Wikipedia articles, sorted by location.

Övörkhangai
 Erdene Zuu Monastery

Selenge
 Amarbayasgalant Khiid
 Shankh Monastery

Ulaanbaatar
 Gandantegchinlen Khiid Monastery

See also
 Buddhism in Mongolia
 List of Buddhist temples

Notes

External links

 BuddhaNet's Comprehensive Directory of Buddhist Temples sorted by country
 Buddhactivity Dharma Centres database

Mongolia
 
Mongolia
Buddhist temples